Team Iron is a professional swimming team co-owned by Katinka Hosszú, and a founding member of the International Swimming League. The team is based in Budapest, Hungary, led by general manager Dorina Szekeres and head coach Jozsef Nagy.

During the inaugural season in 2019, they finished third in the European group and failed to advance to the ISL Grand Finale hosted at the Mandalay Bay Resort and Casino in Las Vegas.

The team hosted one of the seven matches of the inaugural season in the Duna Arena, in Budapest, where they placed second in front of the home crowd. The visiting teams were London Roar, LA Current and New York Breakers.

2019 International Swimming League season

Team roster 
ISL teams had a maximum roster of 32 athletes for 2019 season, with a suggested size of each club's traveling roster of 28 (14 men and 14 women). Each club had a captain and a vice-captain of different gender. In the 2019 season Katinka Hosszú and Peter John Stevens held those titles for Team Iron.

Match results 
In the 2019 (inaugural) ISL season, Team Iron finished third in the European group behind Energy Standard and London Roar who eventually went on to place 1–2 in the Championship Final. From Team Iron, Vladimir Morozov was named MVP in Lewisville while Katinka Hosszú earned the title  in Budapest in front of the home crowd.

The team was very successful in the 50m freestyle skin races. Vladimir Morozov won the race in Lewisville and London while Ranomi Kromowidjojo had a perfect record of winning the event in all 3 matches of the regular season.

2020 International Swimming League season 
The 2020 roster will be announced in June, 2020.

References 

Sports teams in Hungary
Swimming clubs
International Swimming League
Swimming in Hungary
Sport in Budapest